"Worry About Me" is a song by English singer Ellie Goulding featuring American singer Blackbear, released as the lead single from Goulding's fourth studio album Brightest Blue, through Polydor Records on 13 March 2020. It was written by Goulding and Blackbear with Ilya Salmanzadeh, Peter Svensson and Savan Kotecha, and produced by Ilya. Its release was fast-tracked due to a leak in early March 2020.

Background
After the song was leaked in March 2020, Goulding posted on social media on 5 March "Since one of you decided to leak it... Coming for you next Friday."

Critical reception
Writing for Idolator, Mike Wass opined that Goulding "asserts her independence" on the track, "telling Mr. Clingy to stop sniffing around her business because she's bus[y] having fun [...] over Ilya's thunderous beats", concluding that it is a "banger". Caian Nunes of Popline wrote that Goulding finds "great inspiration in hip-hop" on the track "without losing her pop [sound]".

Music video
The music video was directed by Emil Nava and was released on Goulding's YouTube channel a few hours after the release of the single. A Director's Cut of the video featuring the instrumental "Overture" was released on 30 April 2020.

Charts

Release history

References

2020 songs
2020 singles
Blackbear (musician) songs
Ellie Goulding songs
Song recordings produced by Ilya Salmanzadeh
Songs written by Blackbear (musician)
Songs written by Ellie Goulding
Songs written by Ilya Salmanzadeh
Songs written by Peter Svensson
Songs written by Savan Kotecha